Datuk Ir. Shahelmey bin Yahya (born 19 February 1973) is a Malaysian politician who has served as the Deputy Chief Minister III and State Minister of Works of Sabah in the Gabungan Rakyat Sabah (GRS) state administration under Chief Minister Hajiji Noor since January 2023, Member of Parliament (MP) for Putatan since November 2022 and Member of the Sabah State Legislative Assembly (MLA) for Tanjung Keramat since September 2020. He served as the State Minister of Community Development and People's Wellbeing in GRS administration under Hajiji from October 2020 to his promotion to deputy chief ministership and switch of portfolio in January 2023. He is a member of the United Malays National Organisation (UMNO), a component party of the Barisan Nasional (BN) coalition. He is one of the five BN dissidents who support GRS.

Election results

Honours 
 :
  Commander of the Order of Kinabalu (PGDK) - Datuk (2021)

References

United Malays National Organisation politicians
Members of the Sabah State Legislative Assembly
Living people
1973 births
Commanders of the Order of Kinabalu